The £10,000 Encore Award for the best second novel was first awarded in 1990. It is sponsored by Lucy Astor. The award fills a niche in the catalogue of literary prizes by celebrating the achievement of outstanding second novels, often neglected in comparison to the attention given to promising first books. Entry is by publisher.

List of winners

References

External links

British fiction awards
Awards established in 1990
1990 establishments in the United Kingdom
Society of Authors awards
Royal Society of Literature awards